The Case Swedish Open 2013 is the 2013's Swedish Open, which is a tournament of the PSA World Tour event International (prize money: $70,000). The event took place in Linköping in Sweden from 31 January to 3 February. Grégory Gaultier won his second Swedish Open trophy, beating Nick Matthew in the final.

Prize money and ranking points
For 2013, the prize purse was $70,000. The prize money and points breakdown is as follows:

Seeds

Draw and results

See also
PSA World Tour 2013
Swedish Open (squash)

References

External links
PSA Case Swedish Open 2013 website
Case Swedish Open official website
Case Swedish Open SquashSite website

Squash tournaments in Sweden
Swedish Open Squash
2013 in Swedish sport